Karsten Fischer (born 27 May 1984) is a German former professional footballer who played as a midfielder.

Career 
Fischer was born in Norden. He spent four seasons in the Bundesliga with VfL Wolfsburg. In summer 2007, Fischer joined SC Paderborn and left after two years in June 2009 for Wuppertaler SV.

References

External links
  
 

1984 births
Living people
People from Norden, Lower Saxony
German footballers
Footballers from Lower Saxony
Association football midfielders
Germany under-21 international footballers
SpVg Aurich players
VfL Wolfsburg players
VfL Wolfsburg II players
SC Paderborn 07 players
Wuppertaler SV players
Holstein Kiel players
Bundesliga players
2. Bundesliga players
3. Liga players